Cancellation of removal is a provision of the Immigration and Nationality Act (INA) of the United States that allows some aliens who are in removal proceedings, who have lived in the United States for a long period of time and meet certain other conditions, to apply to remain in the United States and have the removal proceedings terminated. Cancellation of removal was crafted by the U.S. Congress to replace "suspension of deportation," a similar form of relief available prior to April 1, 1997.

Cancellation of removal is potentially available to aliens. A non-Lawful permanent resident (LPR) who is granted cancellation of removal becomes an LPR.

Background

Prior to April 1, 1997, the effective date of IIRIRA, a legal remedy known as "suspension of deportation" was available to aliens in deportation proceedings. Although functionally similar to cancellation of removal, suspension of deportation did not distinguish between "permanent residents" of the United States and "nonpermanent residents." To obtain suspension of deportation, an applicant under the pre-IIRIRA standard was required to fulfill the following: (1) continuous physical presence in the United States for a period of at least seven years; (2) "good moral character" during that entire period; and (3) that the applicant's deportation from the United States would result in "extreme hardship" to the applicant or any qualifying relative, which was mainly the applicant's spouse, parents, or children, who were either citizens or LPRs of the United States. After these three requirements were met, the LPR was granted relief irrespective of his or her age, health, race, color, religion, nationality, political affiliation, political opinion, etc.

Legal standard

Lawful permanent residents of the United States

The INA states the following: 

According to the BIA, "cancellation of removal is both discretionary and prospective in nature."

Nonpermanent residents

Regarding a nonpermanent resident, the Attorney General is expected to cancel the removal proceedings (and adjust the status of such alien to that of an LPR) if the alien:

See also
 Deportation of Americans from the United States
 Waiver of inadmissibility
 Stateless

References
This article in most part is based on law of the United States, including statutory and latest published case law.

External links
 Application for Cancellation of Removal and Adjustment of Status for Certain Nonpermanent Residents (Form EOIR-42B, July 2015)
 Application for Cancellation of Removal for Certain Permanent Residents (Form EOIR-42A, July 2016)

Immigration to the United States
United States immigration law